Civil Service (Wrexham) were a Welsh football and cricket club from Wrexham.

History
Civil Service (Wrexham) first appear in the local press in May 1876 among the Cricket fixtures. The following year the football team participated in the inaugural Welsh Cup competition.

Cup history

Notable players
  Henry Edwards - Wales Football International
  John Price - Wales Football International

References

Defunct football clubs in Wales
Sport in Wrexham
Sport in Wrexham County Borough
Football clubs in Wrexham
Financial services association football clubs in Wales